Istria County is the most northern county in Croatia.

It borders on the west by the country of Slovenia and because it is a triangular peninsula it borders on two sides east and west on the Quarnero Sea. On the east side it borders with Dalmatia County and on the north with. Istria has had an interesting history because it was the center of constant conflicts with various countries, empires and kingdoms of Europe. Because of this there were many monuments, building, including chapels built during the long history.

List of chapels 
St. Lucia d'Albona, (17th century in Skitača)
San Giovanni Battista, (14th century in Brovinje)
San Giuseppe in Koromacno,  20th century,(Today a Market in Koromačno)
San Martino in Cerovica (Istria) in Cerovica (Ruins,18th century)
San Matteo under Mt. Babrini.......(Ruins,13 century)
St. Lorenzo in Produbas also called San Lorenzo d'Albona and Sveti Lovrec Labinski in the hamlets Diminići and Kobaici, (17th century). This chapel became a parish during the division of the District of Albona in 1632. It is located in Istria County, Croatia.
Santa Marina in S.Marina (Istria) in Santa Marina, (13th century). Restored in 1926.
St. Nicolo in Drenje

See also
Brovinje
Cerovica (Istria)
Koromačno
Skitača

References